Qasim Said Sanjoor Hardan (born 20 April 1989), commonly known as Qasim Said, is an Omani footballer who plays for Al-Nasr.

Club career

On 4 June 2014, he agreed a one-year contract extension with Al-Nasr S.C.S.C.

Club career statistics

International career
Qasim is part of the first team squad of the Oman national football team. He was selected for the national team for the first time in 2009. He has made appearances in the 2010 Gulf Cup of Nations, the 2011 AFC Asian Cup qualification, the 2012 WAFF Championship, the 2014 FIFA World Cup qualification and the 2015 AFC Asian Cup qualification.

National team career statistics

Goals for Senior National Team
Scores and results list Oman's goal tally first.

References

External links
 
 
 Qasim Said at Goal.com
 
 
 Qasim Said - ASIAN CUP Australia 2015

1989 births
Living people
People from Salalah
Omani footballers
Oman international footballers
Association football midfielders
2015 AFC Asian Cup players
Al-Nasr SC (Salalah) players
Oman Professional League players